Pink is a quarterly LGBT-focused full-color glossy print magazine launched in 1990 in New York City and headquartered in Chicago, Illinois with content geared toward major markets in San Francisco, New York City, Denver, Los Angeles and Seattle as well as a national edition.

The magazine sometimes sponsors community events. In 2007 they held a fundraiser for the re-election of San Francisco mayor Gavin Newsom, and a "Cupid's Back" Valentine's fundraiser for the GLBT Historical Society. In 2008 they co-hosted "Ladies Night at Charanga" a benefit for the Stop AIDS Project.

References

LGBT-related magazines published in the United States
Quarterly magazines published in the United States
English-language magazines
Magazines established in 1990
Magazines published in Chicago